Karuvannur Puthanveettil Sasi (Malayalam: കെ. പി. ശശി; 14 March 1958 – 25 December 2022) was an Indian film director and cartoonist from Bengaluru.

Life and career
Sasi's father K. Damodaran (25 February 1912 – 3 July 1976) was a Marxist theoretician and writer and one of the founder leaders of the Communist Party of India. He started working as a cartoonist while being a student at JNU during the late seventies. He started experimenting with films on 8mm during the early eighties. His documentaries include "A Valley Refuses to Die", "We Who Make History", "Living in Fear", "In the Name of Medicine" and "Voices from a Disaster", Fabricated!, America America, Resisting Coastal Invasion and Development at Gunpoint.

His feature films include Ilayum Mullum, on the social and psychological violence on women in Kerala. Ek Alag Mausam (A Different Season) (Hindi: एक अलग मौसम) is a 2003 Hindi language movie directed by Sasi and starring Nandita Das, Anupam Kher, Renuka Shahane, Rajit Kapur, Arundathi Nag, Sreelatha and Sally Whittaker, and Ssh..Silence Please, a silent comedy film on development. He was a founder member of ViBGYOR Film Festival.

Sasi died in Thrissur, Kerala, on 25 December 2022, at the age of 64.

Filmography

As director
2016 – Voices from the Ruins
2014 – Fabricated 
2009 – A climate call from the coast 
2009 – Like leaves in a storm''' 
2009 – Tsunami rehabilitation an unfinished business2009 - Gaon chodab nahin2007 – Resisting Coastal Invasion 2006 – If It Rains Again 
2005 – Redefining Peace – Women lead the way 
2005 – America, America2004 – The Source of Life for Sale 
2003 – Ssh..Silence Please 
2002 – Development at Gunpoint 
2001 – Voices from a Disaster 
 1998 – Ek Alag Mausam 
1994 – The Wings of Kokkrebellur1993 – '''Appukkuttan in Time Runs 
1991 – Ilayum Mullum 
1988 – A Valley Refuses to Die
1989 – A Campaign Begins 
1988 – The Rope
1987 – In the Name of Medicine
1986 – Living in Fear 
1985 – We Who Make History and That Angry Arabian Sea
1984 - Science to People

As cartoonist
2004 – InPosters

Books
2000 – When the Birds Stop Singing

References

External links
 
https://www.madhyamam.com/opinion/articles/kp-sasi-struggle-and-memories-1111108
https://www.manoramanews.com/news/breaking-news/2022/12/25/film-documentary-director-kp-sasi-passed-away-25.html
https://www.mathrubhumi.com/movies-music/news/documentary-director-kp-sasi-passed-away-1.8164336
https://www.thehindu.com/entertainment/movies/documentary-filmmaker-kp-sasi-passes-away/article66304997.ece
https://timesofindia.indiatimes.com/entertainment/malayalam/movies/mollywood-director-kp-sasi-passes-away/articleshow/96511706.cms

1958 births
2022 deaths
Film directors from Thrissur
Malayalam film directors
Writers from Thrissur
Indian cartoonists
20th-century Indian film directors
21st-century Indian film directors